Tomtown is a ghost town in southern Carroll County, Kentucky, United States.

References

Ghost towns in Kentucky